Tanguy is the French spelling of Breton given name Tangi from tan, "fire", and ki, "dog". It may refer to:

People

Given name 
Saint Tanguy, sixth-century Breton monk and abbey founder
Tanguy Malmanche (1875–1953), Breton writer
Tanguy Nef (born 1996), Swiss alpine skier
Tanguy Ndombele (born 1996), French footballer
Tanguy Kouassi (born 2002), French footballer

Surname 
 Éric Tanguy, born 1968, French composer; see List of compositions for viola: T to Z
Julien Tanguy (art dealer) (1825–1894), Parisian art supply and art dealer, and subject of three Van Gogh paintings
Yves Tanguy (1900–1955), surrealist painter

Media 
Tanguy, a 1957 novel by Michel del Castillo
Tanguy (film), a 2001 French black comedy film
Tanguy et Laverdure, a French comic about two air force pilots

See also
 
 Tanneguy du Châtel (1369–1449), Grand Master of France

Surnames of Breton origin
Breton masculine given names
Breton-language surnames